Heteromyces is a genus of lichenized fungi in the family Cladoniaceae. It is a monotypic genus, containing the single species Heteromyces rubescens. Both the genus and species were described by Swiss lichenologist Johannes Müller Argoviensis in 1889. The name Heteromyces was also used for a genus circumscribed by Lindsay S. Olive in 1957; this usage is illegitimate because of the prior usage of this name by Müller. Olive's concept of Heteromyces was renamed to Oliveonia by Marinus Anton Donk in 1958.

References

Cladoniaceae
Lichen genera
Monotypic Lecanorales genera
Taxa described in 1889
Taxa named by Johannes Müller Argoviensis